Danuta Bartoszek (born 19 August 1961 in Pyrzyce, Poland) is a former long-distance runner.

Originally from Poland, Bartoszek represented Canada at the 1996 Summer Olympics in Atlanta, Georgia.  At Atlanta, the resident of Mississauga, Ontario finished the women's marathon in 32nd place (2:37:06). In 2001, she competed in the women's marathon at the 2001 World Championships in Athletics held in Edmonton, Alberta, Canada. She finished in 43rd place.

Achievements

References

External links
 
 
  (archive)
 
 
 

1961 births
Living people
Canadian female marathon runners
Athletes from Mississauga
People from Pyrzyce
Sportspeople from West Pomeranian Voivodeship
Athletes (track and field) at the 1994 Commonwealth Games
Athletes (track and field) at the 1996 Summer Olympics
Naturalized citizens of Canada
Olympic track and field athletes of Canada
Polish emigrants to Canada
Track and field athletes from Ontario
Commonwealth Games competitors for Canada
World Athletics Championships athletes for Canada